Music in the plays of William Shakespeare includes both music incidental to the plot, as song and dance, and also additional supplied both by Shakespeare's own company and subsequent performers. This music is distinct from musical settings of Shakespeare's sonnets by later composers.

Music in Shakespeare's own theatre productions

Songs as text within the plays
The following are among the most notable examples of songs in Shakespeare's plays:
"Full Fathom Five" in The Tempest, I, 2
"How Should I Your True Love Know?" in Hamlet IV, 5
"It Was a Lover and His Lass" in As You Like It V, 3
"O Mistress Mine" in Twelfth Night, II, 3
"Sigh No More" in Much Ado About Nothing, II, 3
"Take, O Take Those Lips Away"	in Measure for Measure, IV, 1
"Then They for Sudden Joy Did Weep" in King Lear, I, 4
"The Wind and the Rain" in Twelfth Night, V, 1
"Under the Greenwood Tree" in As You Like It', II, 5
"When Griping Griefs" in Romeo and Juliet, IV, 5
"Where the Bee Sucks" in The Tempest, V, 1
"Willow song" in Othello, IV, 3

Other songs mentioned within the plays
"Caleno custure me" not sung but mentioned in Henry V, IV, 4
“Greensleeves" in The Merry Wives of Windsor.
"Heart's Ease" in Romeo and Juliet'', IV, 5.102

Dance
Among the dances associated with Shakespeare's company is "Kemp's Jig" named after the actor Will Kemp.

Music for later theatre productions
The generations after Shakespeare saw many composers create or arrange music for his plays. Among the most notable were Thomas Morley, Henry Purcell, Matthew Locke, Thomas Arne, William Linley, Sir Henry Bishop, and Sir Arthur Sullivan.

Recordings
Attempts at reconstructing and performing the "original" songs from the plays and related folk songs have been recorded by various musicians, from Shakespeare Songs by Alfred Deller (1967), to the recordings of Philip Pickett.

References

William Shakespeare